The Ute Park Fire was a wildfire one mile east of Ute Park, New Mexico in the United States. The fire started on May 31, 2018. The cause remains under investigation. It threatened the communities of Cimarron and Ute Park, with mandatory evacuations in place from June 1 2, respectively, until June 8th: when both were lifted. The fire destroyed 14 buildings and threatened over 750 structures.

Incidents

May

The Ute Park Fire was first reported after 2 p.m. on May 31, 2018. It was reported burning between Eagle Nest Lake and Cimarron in Colfax County, New Mexico, just off Highway 64 in Ute Park. Fire officials reported the fire being fueled by grass and piñon. Evacuation orders were put in place for the community of Hummingbird Lane and surrounding areas. The fire jumped Highway 64, causing the area of the highway between Eagle Nest Lake and Cimarron to be closed.

June

Twelve structures at Philmont, all unoccupied and non-residential, were reported as burned. Voluntary evacuations were put in place for Cimarron. New Mexico State Parks closed Eagle Nest Lake for helicopters to access water to fight the fire. Cimarron was given mandatory evacuation orders.

The situation remained dynamic into the morning of June 2, as the fire had grown to an estimated  due to wind. Fire crews focused on structure protection in Cimarron by implementing strategic burnouts. The community of Ute Park was put under mandatory evacuation and numerous highways and routes were closed.

It rained in the area on June 3, stunting fire activity. Firefighters focused on mopping up hotspots and suppressing spot fires. The evacuation order for Cimarron was lifted, though the areas of Ute Park, Philmont Scout Ranch, Cimarroncito and Urraca Watersheds, Cimarron Canyon State Park and private lands were still under threat. Eagle Nest Lake State Park was re-opened to boating and Cimarron State Park remained closed through July 8.

The Ute Park Fire was declared 100 percent contained on June 19.

Closures
Cimarron Canyon State Park remained closed until 8 July 2018. All backcountry treks at Philmont Scout Ranch were cancelled for the 2018 season, for the first time since the original donation of the ranch to the BSA in 1938. Backcountry treks were run in both the North and South country in 2019 but the burn zone remained unstable and dangerous. As of July 2022, crews are able to pass through the main road under GPS monitoring.

References

External links
 

June 2018 events in the United States
Colfax County, New Mexico
May 2018 events in the United States
Wildfires in New Mexico
2018 in New Mexico